Joop Geurts (February 20, 1923 – February 26, 2009) was a Dutch professional baseball player for Schoten Haarlem of the Hoofdklasse Honkbal or Major League Baseball in Dutch. He was also a member of the Netherlands national baseball team.

Career
Geurts made his debut in the Dutch national team in 1938 as a catcher, at only 15 years of age. In 1957 he was named Most Valuable Player of the Main Class. Between 1956 and 1960 he captured the European title four times with the Dutch team. Geurts appeared in 36 games over 23 years for the national team. In 1956 he was part of the selection that came out for the first time against the United States team and was also named a team captain.

Geurts was also known by the so-called "ball incident" of 1948 with American ambassador Baruch. The ambassador was invited to throw the first ball at the start of the main class baseball season. Baruch threw the ball to Geurts, who then offered it to the members of the baseball league board that were present. They said they had no interest in the ball and that Geurts could keep it. Geurts asked the ambassador to sign the ball. However, a few days later, the league officials changed their mind and asked for the ball from Geurts. However, he refused because the league representatives had originally told him that he could keep the ball. A scandal arose and Geurts decided to travel to the embassy and asked Baruch to sign a second ball. At an open meeting to decide the fate of Geurts' in this matter, the latter showed the two signed balls and asked the league officials to choose one, which he gave to the leagues, while keeping the other one.

Years later, Geurts was asked by the administrators of the National Baseball Museum if he still had the ball in question. He sent his son Tom Geurts to the attic to search and the ball was found. Ironically, the museum could not find their copy, so only one signed ball is exhibited at the museum today.

Death
Geurts died on February 26, 2009, at the age of 86 in Haarlem. Geurts had some health issues in the final years of his life, however the exact cause of death was not released to the public.

References

1923 births
2009 deaths
Dutch baseball players
Baseball catchers
Sportspeople from Haarlem
People from Avereest
Sportspeople from Overijssel